Viktor Hryhorovych Derdo (Ukrainian: Віктор Григорович Дердо, born 12 April 1954 in Berezivka, Odessa Oblast, Ukraine) is a former Ukrainian professional football referee.

He is the father of another Ukrainian football referee Oleksandr Derdo.

External links
 
 Viktor Derdo referee profile at allplayers.in.ua

1954 births
Living people
K. D. Ushinsky South Ukrainian National Pedagogical University alumni
Ukrainian football referees
Sportspeople from Odesa Oblast